Alex Henning is a visual effects supervisor.

On January 24, 2012, he won an Oscar for the film Hugo at the 84th Academy Awards in the category of Best Visual Effects. His win was shared with  Ben Grossmann, Robert Legato, and Joss Williams.

References

External links

Living people
Visual effects supervisors
Best Visual Effects Academy Award winners
Year of birth missing (living people)